Koshkar (Qoşqar) is a village in the Atyrau Region of western Kazakhstan.

References

Populated places in Atyrau Region